Sherwin Campbell Badger (August 29, 1901 – April 8, 1972) was an American figure skater who competed in singles and pairs.  He earned the men's titles at the U.S. Figure Skating Championships from 1920 through 1924.  He also captured the pairs gold medal with partner Beatrix Loughran three times, and the pair won the silver medal at the 1932 Winter Olympics.  Prior to pairing with Loughran, he competed first with Clara Frothingham and later with Edith Rotch.

After his competitive career ended, he was a skating judge and the head of the U.S. Figure Skating Association.

He was born in Boston, Massachusetts, on August 29, 1901, and died on April 8, 1972, in Sherborn, Massachusetts. In his private life, Badger was briefly married to Mary Bancroft also from the City of Boston, Massachusetts.

He graduated from Harvard University in 1923.

Results

Men's singles

Pairs
with Frothingham

with Rotch

with Loughran

References

1901 births
1972 deaths
American male single skaters
American male pair skaters
Figure skaters at the 1928 Winter Olympics
Figure skaters at the 1932 Winter Olympics
Figure skating officials
Olympic silver medalists for the United States in figure skating
Olympic medalists in figure skating
World Figure Skating Championships medalists
Medalists at the 1932 Winter Olympics
Harvard University alumni